The Finger Points is a 1931 American Pre-Code drama film directed by John Francis Dillon and written by John Monk Saunders, W.R. Burnett and Robert Lord. The film stars Richard Barthelmess, Fay Wray, Regis Toomey, Robert Elliott, Clark Gable, Oscar Apfel and Robert Gleckler. The film was released by Warner Bros. on April 11, 1931.

Clark Gable was chosen to be Louis J. Blanco, the chief enforcer of the mob.  Contracted with MGM, Gable filmed scenes for The Finger Points, Night Nurse, and The Easiest Way simultaneously.

Plot
Breckenridge "Breck" Lee (Richard Barthelmess) is a young, naïve kid from the South who comes to New York to get a job as a newspaperman. After getting hired by The Press, his first assignment is to expose the existence of a newly opened gambling parlor. Gangster Louis J. Blanco (Clark Gable) attempts to bribe Lee to keep quiet. Lee refuses to accept the bribe, and publishes an article about the casino which subsequently gets raided by the police. Mugged and severely beaten by gangsters, Lee winds up in the hospital. Upon leaving the hospital and returning to work, he longs to marry fellow reporter Marcia Collins (Fay Wray), but his meager salary combined with the hospital bill prevents this from happening. Lee attempts to seek a raise from  City Editor Frank Carter (Robert Elliott), but is refused the increase in pay.  Yearning for the aforementioned bribe, Lee re-approaches Blanco with a deal that he will not report on the organization's dealings in return for a fee. As Blanco pays well for Lee's un-reporting, Marcia becomes suspicious of Lee's wealth, but Lee denies any illegality in the acquisition of the money. Becoming increasingly confident of his control, Lee determines to acquire a larger share of the bribes by shaking down the gangsters. After learning that Number One, the head of the organization, is planning on opening a new gambling house, he threatens Blanco that he will print that information unless he gets a bigger share of money.  Upon meeting Number One, Lee obtains the larger graft, but is warned that if the story gets published, he will be in danger. Feeling that Lee is untrustworthy, Collins agrees to marry fellow reporter Charles "Breezy" Russell (Regis Toomey). Consequently, Lee decides to go straight and leave the city with Marcia if she will marry him. She acquiesces, but "Breezy" publishes the gambling story, hoping to impress Marcia. The following morning as Lee and Marcia are getting ready to leave, "Breezy" shows up with his story in the newspaper. After Lee sees it, he decides to go to the bank to retrieve his money despite Marcia's pleas not to. Lee is followed and killed by gangsters.  At his funeral, Lee is named as a hero. Marcia stays quiet, although she knows the truth.

Cast 
 Richard Barthelmess as Breckenridge 'Breck' Lee
 Fay Wray as Marcia Collins
 Regis Toomey as Charlie "Breezy" Russell
 Robert Elliott as City Editor Frank Carter
 Clark Gable as Louis J. Blanco
 Oscar Apfel as Managing Editor Ellis Wheeler
 Robert Gleckler as Larry Haynes, Sphinx Club Manager
Uncredited Roles
 Mickey Bennett as Arthur, Office Boy
 James P. Burtis as Cop
 Martin Cichy as Blanco's Bodyguard
 Bob Perry as Henchman in Haynes' club
 Lew Harvey as Henchman in "Number One's" office
 George Taylor as Henchman in "Number One's" office
 Frank Marlowe as Guard at "Number One's" office
 Herman Krumpfel as Breck's Tailor
 Frank McClure as Casino Patron
 Field Norton as Casino Patron
 Albert Petit as Casino Patron
 J. Carrol Naish as Phone Voice ("The Finger is on You")

Preservation
A surviving feature it is preserved in the Library of Congress.

References

External links 
 
 
 
  1893-1993

1931 films
Warner Bros. films
American drama films
1931 drama films
Films directed by John Francis Dillon
American black-and-white films
1930s English-language films
1930s American films